Berenjabad may refer to:
 Berenjabad, East Azerbaijan
 Berenjabad, West Azerbaijan